Christian Minotti (born 12 May 1980 in Rome) is a long-distance freestyle swimmer from Italy, who won the silver medal in the men's individual 1500 metres freestyle event at the 2002 European Championships in Berlin, Germany. He represented his native country at two consecutive Summer Olympics, starting in 2000.

References 
 Profile

See also
Olympic athletes of Italy

1980 births
Living people
Italian male swimmers
Swimmers at the 2000 Summer Olympics
Swimmers at the 2004 Summer Olympics
Olympic swimmers of Italy
Swimmers from Rome
Medalists at the FINA World Swimming Championships (25 m)
European Aquatics Championships medalists in swimming